The Shepherd of the Hills may refer to:

The Shepherd of the Hills (novel), 1907 American novel by Harold Bell Wright
 The Shepherd of the Hills (1919 film), silent version co-directed by Harold Bell Wright
 The Shepherd of the Hills (1928 film), silent version directed by Albert S. Rogell 
 The Shepherd of the Hills (1941 film), Technicolor version, starring John Wayne
 The Shepherd of the Hills (1964 film), color version, a/k/a Thunder Mountain